A ketosteroid, or an oxosteroid, is a steroid in which a hydrogen atom has been replaced with a ketone (C=O) group.

A 17-ketosteroid is a ketosteroid in which the ketone is located specifically at the C17 position (in the upper right corner of most structure diagrams).

Examples of 17-ketosteroids include:

 Androstenedione
 Androstanedione
 Androsterone
 Dehydroepiandrosterone
 Epiandrosterone
 Epietiocholanolone
 Etiocholanolone

17-Ketosteroids are endogenous steroid hormones.

See also
 Hydroxysteroid
 Hydroxysteroid dehydrogenase

External links
 
 

Ketones
Steroids